Banak is a small peninsula in Porsanger Municipality in Finnmark county, Norway. It juts into the Vestbotn bay of the vast Porsangerfjorden. Located immediately north of the village of Lakselv, the peninsula has Brennelvfjorden to its east and the river Lakselva to the east. Banak is the site of Lakselv Airport, Banak and Banak Air Station.

References

Porsanger
Peninsulas of Troms og Finnmark